Netaji Nagar is a part of South West Delhi and comes under the New Delhi parliamentary area. It predominantly has official government residences/quarters. The community is located close to Shanti path which has several embassies. The Prime Minister's residence is approximately 2 km away. Delhi College of Arts and Commerce is situated in the locality. Some other nearby locations include Safdarjung Enclave, R.K. Puram Sector 13, Hyatt Regency hotel, Bhikaji Cama Place, Palika  Bhawan, Leela Palace.The area is named in the memory of Netaji Subhas Chandra Bose

There was an illegal slum there which was demolished on 19 September 2010.

References

Neighbourhoods in Delhi
Memorials to Subhas Chandra Bose